Pollo al disco (literally, "chicken á la disk") is a hearty Argentine dish consisting of chicken and various vegetables cooked as a stew in an uncovered deep pan over an open fire.  "Disco" refers to the pan used to cook the dish, which is usually around 24 inches in diameter and at least 6 inches deep.  It is unknown where and when pollo al disco originated, but it is thought that the first pollo al disco was cooked using a worn out plow disk near Buenos Aires.  It remains a popular meal for parties and other gatherings.

See also
 List of chicken dishes

References

Argentine cuisine
Chicken dishes
Meat stews